Rogier Jansen (born 29 August 1984) is a Dutch retired basketball player and current coach. Jansen has represented the Dutch national basketball team multiple times.

Professional career
On 2 July 2003 Jansen signed with Hanzevast Capitals - or Donar - from Groningen. In the 2003–04 season Jansen won the Dutch national championship with the team. In 2005, he got his first NBB Cup.

In the 2005–06 season Jansen played for BC Omniworld in Almere.

Jansen returned to Groningen in 2007.

After two seasons with the Capitals, he signed with EiffelTowers Den Bosch. In the 2011–12 season Jansen won the Dutch Basketball League with Den Bosch. It was his second national championship.

During the 2012–13 season, Jansen returned to his former club Donar, now named GasTerra Flames. His contract wasn't extended.

On 28 June 2013 it was announced Jansen signed with the Den Helder Kings for the 2013–14 season.

In August 2014, Jansen signed a 2-year deal with Zorg en Zekerheid Leiden. In the 2015–16 season, Jansen was named DBL Sixth Man of the Year.

On 26 October 2017, Jansen signed with CB Clavijo of the Spanish second tier LEB Oro. He transferred to Ourense in November 2017. In March 2018, Jansen signed with his third Spanish club of the season, CD Estela of the Liga EBA.

Coaching career
Jansen was assistant coach with Apollo Amsterdam in the 2018–19 season.

Honours

Club
Donar Groningen
Dutch Basketball League (1): 2003–04 
NBB Cup (1): 2004–05
EiffelTowers Den Bosch
Dutch Basketball League (1): 2011–12

Individual
DBL MVP Under 23 (1): 2006–07
DBL All-Star (4): 2009, 2014,2015,2016
DBL Rookie of the Year (1): 2003–04

References

1984 births
Almere Pioneers players
Living people
Den Helder Kings players
Donar (basketball club) players
Dutch Basketball League players
Dutch men's basketball players
Leuven Bears players
Shooting guards
Heroes Den Bosch players
Basketball players from Amsterdam
West-Brabant Giants players
CB Clavijo players
B.S. Leiden players